Mujibur Rahman and Sirajul Islam are businessmen in New York City known for numerous guest appearances on the Late Show with David Letterman.

Natives of Bangladesh, each immigrated to New York and became employed at souvenir shop K&L's Rock America, near the Ed Sullivan Theater, where The Late Show was produced. David Letterman did frequent comedy spots featuring the salesmen, and in 1994 he sent them across the country as roving correspondents for the show. The duo toured many U.S. towns and cities and were greeted as celebrities. Sirajul threw the opening pitch in a home game for the Sioux City Explorers. The two were also sent to Super Bowl XXIX to tape spots for The Late Show.

Mujibur appeared as himself in the episode "The Documentary" of the 1995 situation comedy Double Rush. Mujibur and Sirajul guest-starred as themselves on an episode of the Cartoon Network Adult Swim show Space Ghost Coast to Coast, in which they ate pizza intended for Space Ghost, Zorak, and Moltar.

In 2003, when K&L's Rock America closed due to an increase in rent, Letterman told the duo he would miss them, and gave them each a dozen roses and a new vacuum cleaner as parting gifts.

See also
 List of David Letterman sketch participants

References

David Letterman
Bangladeshi emigrants to the United States
Living people
Year of birth missing (living people)